Aneil is a male given name. Notable people with the name include:

 Aneil Kanhai (born 1982), Trinidadian cricketer
 Aneil Nambiar (born 1984), Indian cricketer
 Aneil Rajah (born 1955), Trinidadian cricketer

See also
 Anil (given name)

Masculine given names